Daniel Ryfa (born December 17, 1979) is a Swedish pilot. 
He is a pilot of the Challenger class of the Red Bull Air Race World Championship.

Biography 
Ryfa was born in Stockholm, Sweden in 1979.

Daniel Ryfa is the winner of 6th FAI European Advanced Aerobatic Championship 2009. Most successful Scandinavian aerobatic pilot in times.

In 2014, he joined the Red Bull Air Race as Challenger class pilot. Race seasons 2014-2019 with most podiums in the challenger class (22 podiums / 8 race winns).

He maneuvers planes such as Pitts Special, Edge 540, Extra 330LX, Sukhoi Su-26, Royal Aircraft Factory S.E.5 and Piper Cub L-4 J Grasshopper.

Results

Red Bull Air Race

Challenger Class 

Legend: * CAN: Cancelled * DNP: Did not take part * DNS: Did not start * DSQ: Disqualified

References

External links
 

1979 births
Living people
Swedish aviators

Red Bull Air Race World Championship pilots
Aerobatic pilots